You Can't Keep the Change is a 1940 thriller novel by the British writer Peter Cheyney. It is the third in his series of novels featuring the London private detective Slim Callaghan, a British version of the increasingly popular hardboiled American detectives.

Plot
Slim Callaghan is called to Margraud Manor in Devon where valuable jewels have been stolen. His investigations take him to a shady nightclub in London haunted by the criminal classes.

References

Bibliography
Magill, Frank Northen. Critical Survey of Mystery and Detective Fiction: Authors, Volume 1. Salem Press, 1988.
Server, Lee. Encyclopedia of Pulp Fiction Writers. Infobase Publishing, 2014. .

1940 British novels
Novels by Peter Cheyney
British thriller novels
Novels set in London
Novels set in Devon
British crime novels
William Collins, Sons books